The 2014 Champion Hurdle was a horse race held at Cheltenham Racecourse on Tuesday 11 March 2014. It was the 84th running of the Champion Hurdle.

The winner was J. P. McManus's Jezki, a six-year-old gelding trained in Ireland by Jessica Harrington, who was winning the race for the first time. The winning jockey was Barry Geraghty, who had won the race on Punjabi in 2009.		
	
The only previous winner of the race was Hurricane Fly, who had won in 2011 and 2013. A. P. McCoy opted to ride My Tent Or Yours rather than Jezki. All nine of the runners had previously won at Grade I level. Our Conor was fatally injured in a fall at the third hurdle.

Race details
 Sponsor: Stan James
 Purse: £400,000; First prize: £238,051
 Going: Good to Soft
 Distance: 2 miles 110 yards
 Number of runners: 9
 Winner's time: 3m 45.25

Full result

 Abbreviations: nse = nose; nk = neck; hd = head; dist = distance

Winner's details
Further details of the winner, Jezki.
 Sex: Gelding
 Foaled: 8 March 2008
 Country: Ireland
 Sire: Milan; Dam: La Noire (Phardante)
 Owner: J. P. McManus
 Breeder: Gerard McGrath

References

Champion Hurdle
 2014
Champion Hurdle
Champion Hurdle
2010s in Gloucestershire